John Alexander Robertson (born 28 March 1976) is a Scottish former professional footballer.

Robertson played for several Scottish clubs, including Ayr United, St Johnstone, Hamilton and Partick Thistle. During his time at Thistle, he initially played at right back, but later played at right centre-back and occasionally sweeper.

References

External links 
 

1976 births
Living people
Association football defenders
Scottish footballers
Stranraer F.C. players
Ayr United F.C. players
Oxford United F.C. players
St Johnstone F.C. players
Ross County F.C. players
Hamilton Academical F.C. players
Partick Thistle F.C. players
Scottish Football League players
Footballers from Irvine, North Ayrshire
English Football League players